The men's coxless four competition at the 1952 Summer Olympics took place at Meilahti, Finland.

Results
The following rowers took part:

References

External links

Rowing at the 1952 Summer Olympics